Club Deportivo Titan de Texistepeque is a Salvadoran football club based in Texistepeque, Santa Ana Department, El Salvador.

The club currently participates in the Segunda División de Fútbol Salvadoreño. Their home stadium is Cancha Sandoval.

History
Founded in 1930, Titán won their first league title on 26 December 2010, with a victory over Juventud Independiente, thanks to a goal from Panamanian striker Víctor Barrera. They won their second title however both time they lost their promotion matches to Juventud Independiente and Santa Tecla F.C. On 9 July, Titan sent a message on their official page announcing due to financial trouble the club sold their spot in the segunda division to C.D. Sonsonate.

Honours

Domestic honours
 Segunda División Salvadorean and predecessors 
 Champions (2) : Apertura 2010, Apertura 2011
 Tercera División Salvadorean and predecessors 
 Champions:(2) : 1970-71, 2007-08
 Liga ADFAS and predecessors 
 Champions:(1) :

List of managers
  Francisco Javier Flores ("Paco Flores")
  Tadeo Ávalos
  Jose Antonio García Prieto
  Jorge Abrego (2010)
  Antonio García Prieto (2010–2012)
 Hiatus (2013-2018)
   Enzo Henríquez (July 2018 - December 2018)
  Jose Antonio García Prieto (January 2019 - October 2019)
  Edgar Batres (October 2019 - Present)

References

External links
C.D. Titán
Club Deportivo Titán (@CD_Titan) | Twitter
 

Football clubs in El Salvador
Association football clubs established in 1930
1930 establishments in El Salvador